Rankin Wiley Jr. was the Democratic President of the West Virginia Senate from Mason County and served from 1893 to 1895. He died in 1929 of a cerebral hemorrhage.

References

Democratic Party West Virginia state senators
Presidents of the West Virginia State Senate
1853 births
1929 deaths
People from Point Pleasant, West Virginia